Lukmon Lawal (born 19 November 1988) is a Nigerian boxer. At the 2012 Summer Olympics, he competed in the Men's light heavyweight, but was defeated in the first round.  He competed in the same division at the 2014 Commonwealth Games.

References

Living people
1988 births
Nigerian male boxers
Olympic boxers of Nigeria
Boxers at the 2012 Summer Olympics
Light-heavyweight boxers
Boxers at the 2014 Commonwealth Games
Boxers at the 2018 Commonwealth Games
Commonwealth Games competitors for Nigeria
African Games silver medalists for Nigeria
African Games medalists in boxing
Competitors at the 2011 All-Africa Games
Sportspeople from Lagos
21st-century Nigerian people